Kurchatov (in Kazakh and Russian: Курча́тов) is a town in East Kazakhstan Region in north-east Kazakhstan.  Named after Soviet nuclear physicist Igor Kurchatov, the town was once the centre of operations for the adjoining Semipalatinsk Test Site.  With the cessation of nuclear testing and the decommissioning of the test site, Kurchatov's population has fallen from over 20,000 to around 8,000.  In its heyday Kurchatov (which was known by its postal code Semipalatinsk-21) was a closed city, one of the most secretive and restricted places in the Soviet Union. The nuclear facilities at Kurchatov are managed by the Kazakhstan Institute of Atomic Energy, a division of the country's National Nuclear Center.

Geography

Infrastructure
A railway connects Kurchatov to Pavlodar and Astana to the west and to Semey  to the east.

Citizens 
According to Stawkowskki, the citizens of Kurchatov have a unique way of viewing themselves. Instead of believing they are victims of the radiation in the area, they consider themselves "radioactive mutants." They see the effects of the radiation as a “locally specific form of adaptation” and believe that any citizens who move out of the area die due to no longer being in an irradiated environment. While they embrace their radiation exposure, they also acknowledge the chronic ailments it has caused such as rashes, high blood pressure, heart problems, and cancers. However, they believe the radiation is keeping them alive and that clean air would actually kill them which is why so few leave the area.

It is very hard to tell just what effects are caused by radiation exposure due to the extremely long latency period. Although it is clear there is no amount of radiation exposure that does not cause any effects, there is no evidence that it can cause certain disorders. The consensus on radiation exposure also says that genetic damage caused by the radiation cannot be passed down to offspring. Despite the many ailments the people of Kurchatov have suffered through, they reject the idea that they are victims.

Their settlement is less than optimal with crumbling concrete blocks, dismantled buildings, and cowsheds with hay on top. This means that fire can spread easily through the village. When the first fire of 2010 took place, Stawkowskki was in Kurchatov doing ethnographic work. She witnessed the fire and the efforts to put it out before it crossed into the village. Nobody worried about the radioactive substances that still exist in the area and the villages seemed to lack fear which she believes reflected their historical, social, political, and economic contexts as well as their lack of knowledge about their situation.

References

External links
 Photographs of Kurchatov taken by an IAEA delegate
 Photographs of buildings in Kurchatov
 Tourism tips for visiting Kurchatov
 "Kurchatov" in Bradt Kazakhstan Guide
 "Visit to the Semipalatinsk Nuclear Test Site", a blog by a nuclear tourist.
 Stanford University: The Semipalatinsk Legacy

Populated places in East Kazakhstan Region
Populated places on the Irtysh River